Dharampani may refer to:

Dharampani, Gandaki
Dharampani, Rapti